Dawkijhar is a locality in Bijni, This palace connect the city with NH 31. Here in one of the major bus stands of the Bijni.

See also
 Headlines Today
 Lok Sabha TV
 NEO Cricket
 UTVi
 IBN7

References

Neighbourhoods in Bongaigaon